Lepota & Zdravlje (Beauty & Health) is a monthly women's glossy magazine, started in February 2001, by Color Press Group, a Serbian media company. The articles in the magazine are about beauty, style, fashion, sex, relationships, celebrities etc.
Besides Serbian, Lepota & Zdravlje has 5 international editions (for other countries of former Yugoslavia): Bosnia & Herzegovina (from February 2008), Croatia (from September 2008), Macedonia (from June 2008), Montenegro (from May 2009) and Slovenia (from November 2007).

Logos
From February 2001, there have been four different logos for this magazine. The first logo of magazine is used from February 2001 to November 2004, the second logo is used from November 2004 to March 2006, the third logo is used from March 2006 to January 2007, and the fourth and current logo is in use from January 2007.

The Serbian, Croatian, Bosnian, Macedonian and Montenegrin editions of magazine use his full name as logo. The Slovenian edition of magazine from March 2008 as logo uses the monogram L&Z instead of his full name.

2019 magazine redesign 
From October 2019, Lepota & Zdravlje was redesigned because of collaboration with American magazines Shape and Health for Serbian, Croatian, Bosnian, Slovenian and Montenegrin editions.

See also
Color Press Group

References

External links
 Editor website
 Lepota i Zdravlje official website

Magazines established in 2001
Monthly magazines
Magazines published in Serbia
Serbian-language magazines
Women's magazines